Dhavalsinh Narendrasinh Zala  is an independent Indian politician. He was elected to the Gujarat Legislative Assembly from Bayad in the 2017 Gujarat Legislative Assembly election as a member of the Indian National Congress and again elected after 2022 Gujarat Legislative Assembly election from the same constituency as an independent candidate. He belongs to the Koli community of Gujarat.

Zala along with Alpesh Thakor quit Indian National Congress and was a member of the post 2019 Indian Rajya Sabha elections in Gujarat. He fought by 2019 bye-election but lost.

He is the Vice President of Gujarat Kshatriy Thakor Sena. He also plays the role of Thakor Sena spokesperson.

He again contested from Bayad in the bypoll held on 21 October 2019 and lost to the Congress candidate.

References

1975 births
Living people
Indian National Congress politicians from Gujarat
People from Aravalli district
Gujarat MLAs 2017–2022
Bharatiya Janata Party politicians from Gujarat